Edward Daniel Cartier (August 1, 1914 – December 25, 2008), known professionally as Edd Cartier, was an American pulp magazine illustrator who specialized in science fiction and fantasy art.

Born in North Bergen, New Jersey, Cartier studied at Pratt Institute. Following his 1936 graduation from Pratt, his artwork was published in Street and Smith publications, including The Shadow, to which he contributed many interior illustrations, and the John W. Campbell, Jr.-edited magazines Astounding Science Fiction, Doc Savage Magazine and Unknown. His work later appeared in other magazines, including Planet Stories, Fantastic Adventures and other pulps.

WWII
Cartier served in World War II, and he was severely wounded in the Battle of the Bulge. He returned to the United States and attended the Pratt Institute again on the G.I. Bill, receiving a Bachelor of Fine Arts degree in 1953. In the post-war years, he continued providing illustrations for Astounding and also for Gnome Press and Fantasy Press.

However, low pay for such illustrations led Cartier into employment as a draftsman for an engineering firm during the 1950s. He worked for more than 25 years as an art director with Mosstype, a Waldwick, New Jersey, manufacturer specializing in printing machinery.

Cartier died at age 94 on December 25, 2008, at his home in Ramsey, New Jersey. He is interred at George Washington Memorial Park in Paramus, New Jersey.

Awards and reprints
Cartier was given the 1992 World Fantasy Lifetime Achievement Award. In 1996 and 2001, he was nominated for Retro Hugo Awards for artwork published in 1945 and 1951.

Edd Cartier: The Known and the Unknown is a 2000-copy limited edition hardcover published by Gerry de la Ree in 1977. Cartier's illustrations of L. Ron Hubbard's fiction were reprinted in Master Storyteller: An Illustrated Tour of the Fiction of L. Ron Hubbard by William J. Widder (Galaxy Press, 2003.).

References

External links
 
 

AP Obituary in The Jersey Journal

1914 births
2008 deaths
American magazine illustrators
American speculative fiction artists
Analog Science Fiction and Fact people
Artists from New Jersey
Burials at George Washington Memorial Park (Paramus, New Jersey)
Fantasy artists
People from North Bergen, New Jersey
People from Ramsey, New Jersey
Pratt Institute alumni
Science fiction artists
United States Army personnel of World War II
United States Army soldiers